Emblems is the fifth album by Matt Pond PA, released in 2004.

Track listing
 "KC" – 2:53
 "Closest (Look Out)" – 4:48
 "Lily Two" – 4:03
 "Bring on the Ending" – 4:14
 "The Butcher" – 4:15
 "New Hampshire" – 4:50
 "Claire" – 3:03
 "Summer (Butcher Two)" – 4:27
 "East Coast E." – 4:00
 "Last Song" – 4:06
 "Grave's Disease" – 4:23
 "Close (KC Two)" – 4:49

References

2004 albums
Matt Pond PA albums